is a railway station on the Yamada Line in the city of Miyako, Iwate, Japan, operated by East Japan Railway Company (JR East).

Lines
Hiratsuto Station is served by the Yamada Line, and is located 52.2 kilometers from the terminus of the line at Morioka Station.

Station layout
Hiratsuto Station has a single side platform serving a single bi-directional line. The station is unattended.

History
Hiratsuto Station opened on 31 October 1931.  The station was absorbed into the JR East network upon the privatization of the Japanese National Railways (JNR) on 1 April 1987.

Surrounding area
  National Route 106

See also
 List of railway stations in Japan

References

External links

  

Railway stations in Iwate Prefecture
Yamada Line (JR East)
Railway stations in Japan opened in 1931
Miyako, Iwate
Stations of East Japan Railway Company